Martin Wood may refer to:
 Martin Wood (director), Canadian television director
 Sir Martin Wood (1927–2021), British engineer, co-founder of Oxford Instruments
 Martin Wood (rugby league) (born 1970), English former Rugby League footballer
 Martin B. Wood, American farmer, banker, telegraph installer and shareholder